Capital Department is a  department of Corrientes Province in Argentina.

Settlements
Corrientes
Laguna Brava
Riachuelo

Departments of Corrientes Province